Manthei is a surname. Notable people with the surname include:

Holly Manthei (born 1976), American soccer player
Kevin Manthei (born 1970), American composer